International Commission of Agricultural Engineering - CIGR (Commission Internationale du Genie Rural) founded in 1930 in Liège, Belgium, is the highest non-governmental world organization in the field. Its membership includes American Society of Agricultural and Biological Engineers (ASABE), Asian Association for Agricultural Engineering (AAAE), European Society of Agricultural Engineers (EurAgEng), Latin American and Caribbean Association of Agricultural Engineering (ALIA), South and East African Society of Agricultural Engineering (SEASAE), Euro Asian Association of Agricultural Engineers (EAAAE), Association of Agricultural Engineers of South-Eastern Europe (AAESEE), and many national societies.

Aims of CIGR
The main missions of CIGR are to
 stimulate the development of science and technology in the field of Agricultural Engineering,
 encourage education, training and mobility of young professionals,
 encourage interregional mobility,
 facilitate the exchange of research results and technology,
 represent the profession at a worldwide level,
 work towards the establishment of new associations, both at national and regional level, and to the strengthening of existing ones, and to
 perform any other activity that will help to develop Agricultural Engineering and allied sciences.

CIGR Structure
The structure of CIGR is divided by seven technical Sections and various working groups. Each technical Section is charged with promoting and developing its respective field of science and technology as it relates to agricultural engineering. The CIGR Working Groups are appointed by the Executive Board to carry out studies on specific subjects of international importance and interest.

 CIGR Technical Sections:
Section I: Land and Water Engineering 
Section II: Farm Buildings, Equipment, Structures and Environment 
Section III: Equipment Engineering for Plant Production 
Section IV: Rural Electricity and other Energy Sources 
Section V: Management, Ergonomics and Systems Engineering 
Section VI: Postharvest Technology and process Engineering 
Section VII: Information Systems
 CIGR Working Groups:
Earth Observation for Land and Water Engineering Working Group
Animal Housing in Hot Climate Working Group
Rural Development and the Preservation of Cultural Heritages Working Group
Cattle Housing Working Group 
Agricultural Engineering University Curricula Harmonization Working Group 
Rural Landscape Protection and Valorization Working Group
Image Analysis for Agricultural Processes and Products Working Group

CIGR Presidents
1930-1950 Prof. Georges Bouckaert 
1950-1962 Prof. Armand Blanc
1963-1967 Prof. Eladio Aranda Heredia
1967-1969 Honorary Doctor Pierre Regamey
1969-1974 Prof. Karel Petit
1974-1979 Mr. Fiepko Coolman
1979-1980 Mr. Talcott W. Edminster  
1985-1989 Prof. László Lehoczky
1989-1991 Prof. Paul McNulty
1991-1994 Prof. Giuseppe Pellizzi
1995-1996 Prof. Egil Berge
1997-1998 Prof. Osamu Kitani
1999-2000 Prof. Bill Stout
2001-2002 Prof. El Houssine Bartali
2003-2004 Prof. Axel Munack
2005-2006 Prof. Luis Santos Pereira
2007-2008 Prof. Irenilza de Alencar Naas
2009-2010 Prof. Søren Pedersen
2011-2012 Prof. Fedro Zazueta

See also 
 Agricultural Engineering
 Engineering
 Food Engineering
 Contemporary Food Engineering
 Food and Bioprocess Technology

External links 
 Official website

International learned societies
Engineering societies
Organizations established in 1930